The South Africa A cricket team toured Zimbabwe in May and June 2021 to play four unofficial One Day International matches (with List A status) and two unofficial Test matches (with first-class status) against the Zimbabwe A cricket team. The fixtures for the tour were confirmed by Zimbabwe Cricket  on 17 May 2021, with all of the matches having played in Harare. Zimbabwe Cricket's official YouTube channel streamed all the matches live.

Background 
On 18 May 2021, Zimbabwe Cricket announced 16-man squads for both the unofficial ODI and Test series, with Tendai Chatara named as the captain for the List A series, while Richmond Mutumbami as the captain for the first-class format. On the same day, Cricket South Africa also named 16 man-squads for the tour, with Zubayr Hamza named as the captain for both formats.

This tour was Zimbabwe A's first since 2017, while the tour was also the first bilateral series for South Africa A since the COVID-19 pandemic struck. The Zimbabwe Cricket's Director of Cricket Hamilton Masakadza stated, "The importance of the Zimbabwe A team cannot be overemphasised and, needless to say, we couldn’t be happier to have the boys finally back in action." He added, "Playing regularly at this level will help our players bridge the gap between domestic cricket and the international game. We are grateful to Cricket South Africa for accepting our invitation and we are looking forward to an exciting, competitive series between the two sides."

The unofficial ODI series were used by South Africa as the preparation for their away series against the West Indies in June 2021. Cricket South Africa’s convenor of selectors Victor Mpitsang said, "We are pleased to have our ‘A’ team playing again. This is vital for the growth of our next tier of players who have been starved of international experience of late." Mpitsang added, "The one-day series in particular will act as match preparation for our Proteas who will be taking part in the white-ball leg of the tour to the West Indies."

The second unofficial Test match was suspended due to the COVID-19 restrictions set by the Zimbabwean government. Zimbabwe's Sports and Recreation Commission (SRC) instructed an end to all sporting activities from 14 June 2021. In response, Zimbabwe Cricket agreed to put a stop to all cricket activities but would appeal the government for the fixture to be completed in a bio-secure environment and to permit the national men's team to continue preparations for the home series against Bangladesh and the tour of Ireland in August.

Squads

Series summary 
South Africa A won the inaugural match of the bilateral List A series by 6 wickets while chasing the target of 320. An unbeaten century by Theunis de Bruyn helped South Africa A make a strong start to their tour of Zimbabwe as they comfortably beat their hosts by six wickets. Bruyn smashed 113 runs off just 64 balls which led the visitors to conquer the match despite being punished from Tadiwanashe Marumani's 82 off 73 and Dion Myers's 96 off 91 balls. While in the second match, despite another fighting innings from Dion Myers, who scored 70 in excellent style, Zimbabwe A went down to another heavy defeat, by 184 runs, at the hands of South Africa A at Harare Sports Club. Ryan Rickelton starred in South Africa's massive victory as he scored his career-best knock of 169 runs. Captain Zubayr Hamza, batting way down at eight, provided handy contributions in the tail end from South Africa when he struck an unbeaten 37 off 17 balls to lift them to a 366 target.

In the third rain-affected List A match, Chamu Chibhabha and Milton Shumba's magnificent unbroken fifth-wicket partnership of 124 earned Zimbabwe A a fine victory over South Africa A by 22 runs according to the Duckworth–Lewis–Stern method. This victory kept Zimbabwe A alive in the series despite losing early four wickets within 46 runs. Chamu Chibhabha's 85 runs off 103 balls, Milton Shumba's 50 runs off 98 balls, and consistent bowling figures of all Zimbabwean bowlers starred in this victory, as South Africa A were losing wickets regularly in the batting innings. In the final List A match, the batting unit of Zimbabwe A again suffered as the visitors seal the one-day series winning the match by 116 runs. Reeza Hendricks slammed 89 runs off 105 balls and Theunis de Bruyn handily contributed in the late overs, which led South Africa A to secure 281 runs in 50 overs. The economic bowling figures of all South African bowlers, with Senuran Muthusamy as the best bower, who bagged 4 wickets for 36 runs as Zimbabwe A were restricted to 165 runs, with more than 11 overs to spare.

List A series

1st Unofficial ODI

2nd Unofficial ODI

3rd Unofficial ODI

4th Unofficial ODI

First-class series

1st Unofficial Test

2nd Unofficial Test

Notes

References

External links 

 Series home at ESPNcricinfo

A team cricket
2021 in Zimbabwean cricket
2021 in South African cricket